Auerswaldiella is a genus of fungi in the family Botryosphaeriaceae. According to the Dictionary of the Fungi, there are four species, widespread in tropical regions.

Species
Auerswaldiella amapaeasis Bat. & H. Maia 1966
Auerswaldiella lithocarpicola Sivan. & W.H. Hsieh 1989
Auerswaldiella nervisequens Chardón ex Arx & E. Müll. 1954
Auerswaldiella novoguineensis Otani 1973
Auerswaldiella ocoteae Bat. 1954
Auerswaldiella parvispora M.L. Farr 1989
Auerswaldiella puccinioides (Speg.) Theiss. & Syd. 1914
Auerswaldiella winteri Arx & E. Müll. 1954

References

Botryosphaeriales
Taxa named by Hans Sydow
Taxa described in 1914